An  is a type of Japanese traditional doll from Imado, today a part of Tokyo. Imado dolls are made from a kind of pottery known as Imado ware. Many different subjects may be depicted but one of the most popular and famous is an anthropomorphic animal, or a variation on the maneki neko, the cat figure which waves its paw to gather prosperity for the residence or business it occupies.

External links 

 https://web.archive.org/web/20090724162102/http://www.h2.dion.ne.jp/~hushimi/tuti/imat.htm

Japanese dolls